Centro District is located in the Valles Centrales Region of the State of Oaxaca, Mexico. The district includes the state capital Oaxaca and satellite towns.
The district has an average elevation of 1,550 meters. 
The climate is mild, with average temperatures ranging from 16°C in Winter to 25°C in spring.

Municipalities

The district includes the following municipalities:

Ánimas Trujano
Cuilapan de Guerrero
Oaxaca de Juárez
San Agustín de las Juntas
San Agustín Yatareni
San Andrés Huayapam
San Andrés Ixtlahuaca
San Antonio de la Cal
San Bartolo Coyotepec
San Jacinto Amilpas
San Pedro Ixtlahuaca
San Raymundo Jalpan
San Sebastián Tutla
Santa Cruz Amilpas
Santa Cruz Xoxocotlán
Santa Lucía del Camino
Santa María Atzompa
Santa María Coyotepec
Santa María del Tule
Santo Domingo Tomaltepec
Tlalixtac de Cabrera

See also
Municipalities of Oaxaca

References

Districts of Oaxaca
Valles Centrales de Oaxaca